Jana Novotná and Helena Suková were the defending champions and successfully defended their title, defeating Betsy Nagelsen and Robin White in the final, 2–6, 6–4, 6–4.

Seeds

Draw

Finals

Top half

Section 1

Section 2

Bottom half

Section 3

Section 4

References

External links 
 ITF tournament edition details/

Miami Open (tennis)
 
Miami Open (tennis)